Cnemaspis flaviventralis is a species of geckos described from the hills of Amboli, Maharashtra, India. Its common name is yellow-bellied day gecko.

References

flaviventralis
Endemic fauna of the Western Ghats
Reptiles of India
Taxa named by Neelesh Dahanukar
Reptiles described in 2016